Henry Jacob Winser (23 November 1833 – 1896) was an American journalist and diplomat.  He is the father of librarian Beatrice Winser.

Winser was born on the island of Bermuda, 23 November 1833. His father, Francis J. Winser, was an officer in the British Navy. He attended the Springfield Academy, Bermuda, then came to New York in 1851, entered a printing-office as proof-reader, and later became a reporter at the New York Times. At the opening of the Civil War he accompanied Colonel Ellsworth as military secretary, and afterward was war-correspondent of the Times. After the war he served for a period as city and night editor of the Times, and then as day-manager of the editorial department. In 1867 he attended the French exposition at Paris as regular correspondent for the Times, and made the trip to Cherbourg in the iron-clad Dunderberg. In May 1869, Winser was appointed United States consul at Sonneberg, Germany, and during his twelve years' service he made several valuable reports to the State Department, including one on forest-culture. In 1882, he was made chief of the bureau of information of the Northern Pacific railway company, but on the retirement of Henry Villard he returned to journalism, first as assistant editor of the New York Commercial Advertiser and afterward as managing editor of the Newark Advertiser.

American male journalists
American diplomats
1833 births
1896 deaths